Ghorahi (Nepali: घोराही उपमहानगरपालिका) is the seventh largest city and largest sub-metropolitan city of Nepal. The city (formerly Tribhuvannagar) lies in Lumbini Province in the Mid-Western part of Nepal. It is the largest city of Dang Deukhuri District of southwest Nepal. It is the largest city of the Rapti Zone and is surrounded by the Sivalik Hills to the south and Mahabharata Range to the north.

Ghorahi is located in the Dang Valley in the foothills of the Himalayas nestled between the Babai River in the east, south, and in the west which ends being the famous Sarayu and Ganges rivers in India. The city is known for its landscape and slightly milder climate and provides a gateway to the surrounding regions of Rolpa, Pyuthan, Salyan and Rukum. It is well-connected and close to tourist destinations such as Bardiya National Park in the west, Surkhet in the north-west, Thawang, Rara Lake, and the Hindu holy lands of Swargadwari and along with the Hindu temples as Pandaveshwor and Ambikeshwori.

It is one of the excellent sub-metropolitan cities based on minimum conditions and performance measurements in the assessment by the local government and financial experts of the commission in the fiscal year 2072/73 V.S. (2015/2016 AD). The city was also the first in the assessment of financial commission by the local body of the Federal Affairs and Local Development Ministry held in the financial year 2067/68 V.S. (2010/11 AD).

It hosts training institutions such as Nepal Sanskrit University, Central Ayurveda College, Rapti Engineering College, Deepjyoti Nursing College, and Mahendra Multiple College. The city population makes a significant contribution to government civil servants. It is home to national factories such as the Ghorahi Cements Ghorahi, Sonapur Cement Factory, Dang Cement Industry. Ghorahi Submetropolitan City Office is locally known as Ghorahi Upa-Mahanagarpalika Karyalaya. Other urban entities involved in civic services and city governance and management include: Tripur Nagar Bikas Samiti, Rampur Gaubikas Samiti, Lakshmipur Gaubikas Samiti, Saudiyar Gaubikas Samiti, and Dharna Gaubikas Samiti. Ghorahi is best known for its high-quality honey and hemp (अल्लो) textiles.

Geography
Ghorahi is the main town of the Rapti Zone and also the headquarters of the Dang district.

The hills of Dang Valley are part of the Mahabharat and Chure Range.

Climate
Ghorahi has a dry-winter humid subtropical climate (Köppen Cwa).

History and prehistory
Hand axes and other artifacts dated to early Paleolithic (1.8 million to 100,000 years ago) have been found in alluvial deposits along the Babai River in Dang Valley. Archeologists classify these as Acheulean, i.e. 'second-generation' toolmaking that succeeds the very oldest Olduwan. There are more numerous, less ancient archeological sites dating to the Upper Paleolithic/Late Pleistocene (about 50,000 to 10,000 years ago). These are also along the Babai, as well as in Deukhuri Valley (Rapti River) adjacent and south of Dang Valley.

Throughout historic times, and probably earlier, the Dang and Deukhuri valleys were home to indigenous Tharu people.

The House of Tulsipur ruled one of the largest Taluqs of Oudh, India, which then included the Dang and Deukhuri Valleys. Therefore, it also counted as one of the Baise Rajya (22 Principalities), a confederation in what became western Nepal. The town shares its name with another Tulsipur in Dang Deukhuri District, Nepal (c.  north); the two towns are linked historically by having the same ruler. About 1760 AD,  these kingdoms were annexed by the Shah Dynasty during the reunification of Nepal. Tulsipur lands south of the Siwalik Hills were not taken. Since Dang was somewhat higher, cooler, better-drained and therefore had fewer instances of malaria than most of Inner Terai Valleys of Nepal, it was settled to some extent by Shah and Rana courtiers and other Nepalese. Deukhuri was more of a Tharu enclave until DDT was introduced to control the malaria-bearing Anopheles mosquito in the 1950s.

The municipality was established 29 January 1979 with the amalgamation of Ghorahi VDC and Sewar Bangaun VDC with a combined population of 12,279. It was named Tribhuvannagar Municipality after King Tribhuvan (ruled 1911–1955). After Nepal became a republic in 2008 the name changed back to Ghorahi Municipality.

Transportation
Local transport in Ghorahi city is by bus or private vehicles. Buses ply frequently on the circular road surrounding the city centre. Heavy local transport can be seen between Ghorahi and its major suburbs which include Tulsipur, Lamahi, Dharna, Narayanpur, and Saudiyar. Like any other growing city, Ghorahi is also expanding with new habitats in the vicinity. Transport services in these areas are also expanding rapidly. Tourist taxis are also an option for out-of-town trips. Locals typically traverse the city on foot. Auto rickshaws are also common as in other cities.

Road
Ghorahi is well-connected by road network to all major cities in Nepal. However, many have been significantly impacted by the rain storms and deteriorated, making travel longer than likely expected.  The East West Highway is connected via a spur road to Ghorahi from Lamahi. Rapti Sarbajanik Yatayat, Shikari Yatayat, Ambikeshwori Yatayat and other private bus agencies provide extensive transport around the valley and Rapti region. Government based transport is not available in the city.

Distance between major towns and Ghorahi:

Krishna Sen Icchuk Highway connects Ghorahi to the East West Highway.

Distance between major towns and Ghorahi:

 Lamahi: 
 Krishnanagar: 
 Nepalgunj: 
 Dhangadhi: 
 Mahendranagar: 
 Bhairahawa: 
 Bharatpur: 
 Kathmandu: 
 Birgunj: 
 Dharan: 
 Biratnagar: 
 Pashupatinagar: 
 Jumla: 
 Pokhara: 
 Birendranagar: 
 Janakpur: 
 Hetauda:

Air
Dang Airport is situated at Tarigaon,  from the city. The airport has infrequent flights to Kathmandu. A new international level airport construction was proposed by the government in 2010 but it was halted due to political turbulence.

Population
The submetropolitan city was established with the amalgamation of Ghorahi municipality, Tripur Municipality and surrounding VDCs with a combined population of 156,164.
 Migration into the city is considered to be very high.

Education
The literacy rate is 73%. Ghorahi is home to Mahendra Multiple College and Nepal's only Sanskrit university Nepal Sanskrit University lies near Beljhundi.  The city is being developed as an educational hub for mid-western Nepal.

Recently, The government of Nepal has decided to establish Rapti Academy of Health Sciences, in line with its decision to establish a state-owned medical college in each province.
The proposed health academy in Dang will be the fifth one owned by the government after the Institute of Medicine, Patan Academy of Health Sciences, Karnali Academy and BP Koirala Academy. Like in the other four academies for medical education, the prime minister will hold the chancellor's post, while the education minister will be the pro-chancellor.

Some of the notable institutions are

 Dang Valley College.
 Deepjyoti Nursing Campus.
 Deepshikha College.
 Deepshikha Higher Secondary Boarding School.
 Gorkha College.
 Gorkha International Higher Secondary Boarding School.
 Janajyoti Vidyamandir.
 Mount View English Boarding School.
Padmodaya Public Model Higher Secondary School.
Siddhartha Academy Higher Secondary School.

Health
A sub-regional level hospital along with a children's hospital, an eye hospital and regional ayurveda hospital serving the people of Ghorag. An important health service the Rapti Academy of Health Sciences has been established and will be operational soon in Ghorahi. Many other private and community level hospitals are providing 24-hour service to the dwellers of Rapti region there. Many private hospitals and nursing homes are also under construction. It also has many clinics with highly experienced and qualified doctors.

Some of the hospitals include:

 Rapti Subregional Hospital
 Umashankarnath Memorial Child Hospital
 Deepjyoti Hospital
 Ghorahi Hospital
 Gorkha Hospital
 Chinari Hospital
 Miteri Hospital
 Dental Clinics

Drinking water
More than six different local water management committees are active for the seamless supply of water in the region. An equal number of private water suppliers are also supplying deepwater to selected households in different regions. Recently, water industries are also supplying packaged mineral water in the city.

Sanitation and landfill site
Ghorahi Sub-Metropolitan city has won the title of "Most clean and sanitated city" of Nepal many times.
Karaute Danda Sanitary Landfill Site – Ghorahi.

The LFS is situated in the vicinity of Ghorahi municipality. Specifically, the LFS is in ward 9, approximately  outside the urban area of Ghorahi. The area used for final disposal has recently been increased within the property. The old site for final disposal now serves as an area for plantation. Moreover, on the property, there is a sorting platform on which a unit of nine employees sorts the MSW into paper and plastics. There is also a storage house where these are stored before further distribution (Khanal et al. 2009). Waste produced in the city is collected through one compactor, one tipper, and some rickshaws. A total of thirty people are involved in sanitary field work. It is one of the five municipalities that have managed their Dumping and Sanitary site in Nepal.

Industrial development
Ghorahi has its proposed industrial site in its number 3 and 5 wards with a possibility of industrial development. Dang Industry Commerce Association has started initiating the industrial development in the district. The Industry Commerce Association has said that there is a consensus for making an industrial zone through continuous discussion with the locals and concerned authorities. The land which will be industrialized lies in numbers 3 and 5 wards of the Sub-Metropolitan city. The area of the land to be industrialized is about 500 bighas.
Many cement industries are already in operation. This has minimized quantity of cement imported from India. The cement industries like Ghorahi cement industry and Sonapur cement industry have started their production; a few others are under construction. Ghorahi cement industry is supposed to be the largest cement industry in Nepal. Poultry and Ostrich Farms are also operating in the city. Many small scale and medium scale industries related to poultry are running in this region.

Food and cuisine
Dal Bhat is a popular cuisine among most of the people in the city. It is eaten twice a day: once after breakfast and at night.

Momo, Chowmein, Samosas, and Chaat are famous in the city.

Media
 Newspapers: the people of Ghorahi are served by several daily local newspapers and national newspapers. There are 13 local newspapers in total. Among these are New Yougbodh Daily, Ganatantra Daily, Rapti Post Daily and Gorakshya Daily. National newspapers are also provided to the people on a daily basis. Some of the National newspapers are The Kathmandu Post, Kantipur, Annapurna Post, and the Himalayan Times among others. Several monthly neighborhood papers serve the town.
 Radio: the state-owned Radio Nepal is broadcast on the 98Mhz frequency in the city. Similarly, six private local FM stations are available. They are: Madhyapaschim FM 91.4 MHz; Indreni FM 92.4 MHz; Jharana FM 88 MHz; Radio Pathshala FM 105.8 MHz; Radio Ganatantra Rapti FM 95.1 MHz; Radio Swargadwari FM 102.8 MHz
 Television: Nepal's state-owned television broadcaster, Nepal Television relay station is present near its border, which provides only one free-to-air terrestrial channels. Besides that, a mix of Nepali, Hindi, English, and other international channels are accessible via cable subscription and direct-broadcast satellite services. Ambikeshwori TV and RC Television are local television channels that cover events in the city.
 Internet: Internet facilities are provided by Nepal Telecom, BroadLink, Lumbininet, WorldLink, and Subisu. Nepal Telecom is the leading internet facilities provider. Wi-Fi connectivity is available at many cafes.

Places of interest
 Ambikeshwori Temple: It is one of the famous temples of Western Nepal. Its history is mentioned in the famous Hindu religious book  Swosthani.

 Ratnanath Mandir: It lies in the 4th ward of the municipality and is known as Gorakshya Siddha Ratna Nath Mandir. It is one of the historic places of Nepal.
 Barhakune Daha and Baraha Temple: It lies in the 7th ward of the municipality. There is a pond that has twelve corners (angles); hence its name barha kune daha. The Temple of God Bishnu, barah is also an important place for pilgrims in that area, and several temples of Ganesh and Shiva are there. A special fair is organised here during Maghe Sankranti. It is also a tourist spot.

 Pandaveshwor Temple: The management committee of Pandaveshwor temple at Dharpani, Dharna-1, has installed a -long trishula that weighs . It is considered to be the largest in the world. It is related to the Pandavas of the famous epic Mahabharata. A special fair is organised during Maha Shiv Ratri. A total of a thousand trees were also planted in the region. 
 Ambapur
 Nama:chu Bouddha Stupa
 Charinge Daha and Bhote Daha
 Sawarikot
 Ghordaura
 Jhinnikot
 Panaura Tharu Cultural Museum
 Martyr Lakhan Thapa Magar Memorial Park : It lies in the centre of the city.
 Netralal Abaghi Memorial Park Gulariya
 Magar Village and Homestay'
 Vulture Restaurant Bijauri
 Jhigaura Sports Stadium

References

External links
 Ghorahi municipality site ; www.ghorahi.gov.np

Nepal municipalities established in 1978
Populated places in Dang District, Nepal
Submetropolitan municipalities of Nepal